The 2019 FIVB Men's Volleyball Olympic Qualification Tournaments, also known as FIVB Tokyo Volleyball Qualification, were the six volleyball tournaments that were contested by 24 men's national teams of the  (FIVB), where the top teams earned a place in the 2020 Summer Olympics volleyball tournament. The tournament was held from 9 to 11 August 2019.

Qualification
Twenty-four teams qualified for the competition as the top twenty-four teams of FIVB World Ranking as of 1 October 2018 (except Japan who qualified as the hosts for the 2020 Summer Olympics.).

Pools composition
Teams were seeded following the serpentine system according to their FIVB World Ranking as of 1 October 2018. Rankings are shown in brackets.

Notes
Teams in bold qualified for the 2020 Summer Olympics.
(): Qualification group hosts

Squads

Venues

Referees

Pool A
 Celso Ricardo Cabrera
 Andrea Puecher
 Lucian-Vasile Nastase
 Evgeny Makshanov

Pool B
 Hernan Gonzalo Casamiquela
 Luiz Henrique Coutinho De Oliveira
 Andrew Cameron
 Alexey Pashkevich

Pool C
 Nasr Shaaban
 Wojciech Maroszek
 Juraj Mokry
 Mario Bernaola Sanchez

Pool D
 Anderson Caçador
 Roy Goren
 Ali Fadili
 Vladimir Simonovic

Pool E
 Marcelo Enzo Pierobon
 Sinisa Isajlovic
 Ivaylo Ivanov
 Pawel Burkiewicz

Pool F
 Shin Muranaka
 Ibrahim Mohd Ahmed Al Naama
 Andrei Zenovich
 Khaled Al-Zughaibi

Pool standing procedure
 Total number of victories (matches won, matches lost)
 In the event of a tie, the following first tiebreaker will apply: The teams will be ranked by the most point gained per match as follows:
Match won 3–0 or 3–1: 3 points for the winner, 0 points for the loser
Match won 3–2: 2 points for the winner, 1 point for the loser
Match forfeited: 3 points for the winner, 0 points (0–25, 0–25, 0–25) for the loser
 If teams are still tied after examining the number of victories and points gained, then the FIVB will examine the results in order to break the tie in the following order:
Set quotient: if two or more teams are tied on the number of points gained, they will be ranked by the quotient resulting from the division of the number of all set won by the number of all sets lost.
Points quotient: if the tie persists based on the set quotient, the teams will be ranked by the quotient resulting from the division of all points scored by the total of points lost during all sets.
If the tie persists based on the point quotient, the tie will be broken based on the team that won the match of the Round Robin Phase between the tied teams. When the tie in point quotient is between three or more teams, these teams ranked taking into consideration only the matches involving the teams in question.

Results

Pool A
Dates: 9–11 August 2019
All times are Eastern European Summer Time (UTC+03:00).

|}

|}

Pool B
Dates: 9–11 August 2019
All times are Central European Summer Time (UTC+02:00).

|}

|}

Pool C
Dates: 9–11 August 2019
All times are Central European Summer Time (UTC+02:00).

|}

|}

Pool D
Dates: 9–11 August 2019
All times are Central European Summer Time (UTC+02:00).

|}

|}

Pool E
Dates: 9–11 August 2019
All times are Moscow Time (UTC+03:00).

|}

|}

Pool F
Dates: 9–11 August 2019
All times are China Standard Time (UTC+08:00).

|}

|}

Qualifying teams for the Summer Olympics

1 The team represented the Soviet Union from 1964 to 1988, and the Unified Team in 1992.

See also
2019 FIVB Women's Volleyball Intercontinental Olympic Qualification Tournaments

References

External links
Official website

2019
Volleyball qualification for the 2020 Summer Olympics
FIVB Olympic Qualification Tournament Men
FIVB Olympic Qualification Tournament Men
FIVB Olympic Qualification Tournament Men
FIVB Olympic Qualification Tournament Men
FIVB Olympic Qualification Tournament Men